Saileriolidae is a family of true bugs and is considered a basal or "primitive" family within the stink-bug lineage. They are found only in Asia. Originally included within the family Urostylididae, the group has recently been recognized as a separate family-rank lineage.

References

Shield bugs
Heteroptera families